Music & Media published a chart of the most popular songs on European radio every week. During the 1990s, the main airplay chart had been changed thrice: European Airplay Top 50 (up to 12 October 1991), European Hit Radio (22 December 1990 to 18 January 1997), and European Radio Top 50 (since 25 January 1997).

European number-one airplay hits

European Airplay Top 50

European Hit Radio

European Radio Top 50

Statistics

Artists by total number-one songs

Notes

References

Europe
Lists of number-one songs in Europe